Absar Ahmed is a Pakistani researcher and archivist of national songs as well as a journalist, broadcaster, and songwriter.

Life and career
Absar was born in Karachi in 1988. He started his career in 2005 as an intern with Geo TV. Later, he has also been working at ARY News, Express TV, and  PTV as a host, researcher, and scriptwriter. He has broadcast some shows and scripted documentaries on Radio Pakistan.

Reportedly, Absar is the first archivist of Pakistan who has preserved more than four and a half thousand rare or almost lost national and patriotic songs. Along with this collection, he has also written several research articles on national songs adapted to music, which have been published in Pakistan's reliable newspapers and magazines, including the Pakistan Army's journal Hilaal.

Books
 Ye Naghme Pakistan Ke (2021) — a catalog and history of Pakistani national songs from 1945 to present.

Radio shows and documentaries
 Absar Ahmed Ke Sath
 Awaz-e-Pakistan
 Tehreek e Pakistan Key Sitare

Songs
 Heeray Jaisay Saal
 Pakistan Ki Main Taqdeer
 Raddul Fasad
 Din Aaya Takbeer ka
 Azb ki hai Zarb
 Lab pe Khan Liaqaut Ali Zaroor Aya- Shaheed-e-Millat
 Arz - E-Pakistan Tere Jan Nisaron Ko Salam
 Main Hoon Pakistan

References

External links
 Official website
 Columns at Daily Jang

1988 births
People from Karachi
Pakistani archivists
Pakistani songwriters
Pakistani broadcasters
Living people